John Wetherby was an Irish senior leader in the first decades of the 18th century.
 
He was Archdeacon of Connor from 1710 to 1736; Dean of Emly from 1710 to 1713; Dean of Cashel from 1714 until 1736. He was also the Archdeacon of Emly from 1723 to 1724.

References

Irish Anglicans
Deans of Emly
Deans of Cashel
Archdeacons of Emly
Archdeacons of Connor